The Bojacá River is a river on the Bogotá savanna and a right tributary of the Bogotá River.

Etymology 
Bojacá is derived from Muysccubun, the indigenous language of the Muisca, who inhabited the Bogotá savanna before the Spanish conquest and means "purple enclosure".

Description 

The Bojacá River originates at the western edge of the Bogotá savanna and flows from the northwest to the southeast through the municipalities Facatativá, Funza, Mosquera and the locality Fontibón of Bogotá before joining the Bogotá River. The southeastern portion of the Bojacá River, after the confluence with the Subachoque River, is called Balsillas. The Bojacá River flows just north of Lake Herrera.

See also 

List of rivers of Colombia
Bogotá savanna

References

External links 
  Sistema Hídrico, Bogotá

Rivers of Colombia
Bogotá River
Geography of Cundinamarca Department
Rivers
Bojaca